The Anti-Submarine Warfare Shallow Water Craft (ASW-SWC) corvettes, are a class anti-submarine warfare vessels currently being built for the Indian Navy, by Cochin Shipyard (CSL) and Garden Reach Shipbuilders & Engineers (GRSE). They were conceived as a replacement to the ageing Abhay-class corvettes of the Indian Navy, and are designed to undertake anti-submarine warfare (ASW) duties – including subsurface surveillance in littoral-waters, search-and-attack unit (SAU) missions and coordinated anti-submarine warfare operations with naval aircraft. They were also designed to provide secondary duties – including defense against intruding aircraft, minelaying and search-and-rescue (SAR).

Equipped with sophisticated sensors and ordnance, the vessels also possess the capabilities to interdict and destroy subsurface targets – primarily hostile submarines, within the vicinity of coastal waters. A total of 16 vessels are being built for the Indian Navy, jointly by CSL and GRSE under the Make in India initiative. The Indian Navy plans to have all 16 vessels in active service by 2026.

History

Background
In December 2013, the Defence Acquisition Council (DAC) –- the main acquisition panel subordinate to India's Ministry of Defence (MoD), approved the procurement of sixteen anti-submarine warfare (ASW) vessels capable of operating in shallow waters, at a cost of INR ₹13,440 crore, to replace the ageing Abhay-class corvettes of the Indian Navy – which were commissioned between 1989 and 1991.

In June 2014, the MoD issued a tender, worth USD $2.25 billion under the 'Buy and Make India' category to private-shipyards – including Larsen & Toubro (L&T), ABG Shipyard, Pipavav Defense and Offshore Engineering (R-Naval), Goa Shipyard (GSL) and Garden Reach Shipbuilders & Engineers (GRSE), for the procurement of the 16 anti-submarine vessels.

In October 2017, Cochin Shipyard (CSL) and Garden Reach Shipbuilders & Engineers (GRSE) emerged as the first and the second-lowest bidder in the tender, respectively.

Purchase
On 29 April 2019, the MoD and GRSE signed a contract valued at INR  for eight anti-submarine vessels, to be delivered between 2022 and 2026. The contract stipulated that the first vessel had to be delivered within 42 months of the date of signing, with the remaining seven vessels delivered at regular intervals.

On 30 April 2019, the MoD and CSL signed a similar contract, valued at INR  for the construction of the remaining eight vessels – within a deadline of 84 months. Under this contract, the first ship was also expected to be delivered within a span of 42 months, with subsequent deliveries of two ships per year.

Construction
On 1 December 2020, CSL initiated the project's construction, with the steel-cutting of the first ASW-SWC vessel, Mahe (BY 523) at Kochi.

On 31 December 2020, GRSE initiated the construction of the stipulated vessels under its agreement, with the steel-cutting ceremony of the first of the eight vessels it had been assigned with, at L&T's shipyard at Kattupalli, near Chennai.

In July 2021, GRSE initiated the construction of two more vessels under its contract, with their respective steel-cutting ceremonies, while the keel of the first vessels (which had begun construction in December, 2020) was laid on 6 August 2021.

CSL initiated the steel-cutting of the fourth and fifth vessels of the series, on 1 December 2021.

Design
 

Under the contract for the construction of the 16 vessels, the two shipyards contracted by the Indian Navy – Cochin Shipyard (CSL) and Garden Reach Shipbuilders and Engineers (GRSE), will respectively build eight vessels of their own, respective designs.

The first eight vessels assigned to GRSE were designed entirely by GRSE's in-house design team, while the remaining eight vessels assigned to CSL were developed by a joint venture – consisting of CSL, Smart Engineering & Design Solutions (India) Ltd. (SEDS) and DA-Group subsidiary Surma Ltd.

The ASW-SWC vessels are the biggest vessels of the Indian Navy to be powered by water-jet propulsion; the vessels' water-jet propulsion system allows the vessel to sprint swiftly for short intervals. The vessels are also reported to possess several features of stealth – including a reduced radar cross-section (RCS), a low acoustic signature and a low infrared signature.

Armament
The ASW-SWC vessels are equipped with one RBU-6000 anti-submarine rocket launcher and two sets of light-weight torpedo-tube launchers for launching anti-submarine torpedoes, (presumably the Advanced Light Weight Torpedo (ALWT)), for neutralizing enemy submarines. The vessels are also equipped with mine rails, which enables the vessel to lay anti-submarine mines along the seabed.

Aside from its primary anti-submarine weaponry, the vessels are also equipped with one small-calibre cannon (presumably the CRN-91 30 mm naval gun) and two 12.7 mm M2 "Stabilized Remote Controlled Gun" remote-weapon stations (RWS), equipped with optronic control systems.

Sensors

For detecting and intercepting hostile submarines, the ASW-SWC vessels are equipped with sophisticated sonar equipment, including a hull-mounted sonar (HMS) and towed low-frequency variable-depth sonar (LFVDS).

Capabilities

Being vessels primed for anti-submarine warfare (ASW), the ASW-SWC vessels were conceived to undertake multiple missions, including "search-and-attack-unit" (SAU) roles, low-intensity maritime operations (LIMO), subsurface surveillance in littoral-waters and coordinated ASW operations with maritime-patrol aircraft (MPA). In addition, the vessels also possess the capability to interdict and destroy subsurface targets, within the vicinity coastal waters. The vessels can also be deployed for search-and-rescue (SAR) missions in littoral waters.

In their secondary role, the vessels will be able to lay mines, to protect domains of crucial importance, such as naval bases and commercial ports, from enemy submarines.

Ships of the class

See also
 Future ships of the Indian Navy
 List of active Indian Navy ships

References

External links
 Expression of Interest issued by GRSE for ASW-SWC

Corvette classes